Events in the year 1910 in India.

Incumbents
 Emperor of India – George V (until 6 May)
 Viceroy of India – Gilbert Elliot-Murray-Kynynmound, 4th Earl of Minto
 Viceroy of India – Charles Hardinge, 1st Baron Hardinge of Penshurst (from 23 November)

Events
 National income - 11,506 million
 4 April – Sri Aurobindo began his spiritual pursuits in India

Law
Indian Museum Act
Indian Electricity Act

Births
30 January – Chidambaram Subramaniam, politician and Minister (died 2000).
10 February – Hafizur Rahman Wasif Dehlavi, Islamic scholar, jurist and literary critic. (died 1987)
19 May – Nathuram Godse, assassin of Mahatma Gandhi,(executed 1949).
19 August – Saint Alphonsa, Sister Alphonsa Muttathupadathu, in 2008 became first woman of Indian origin to be canonized as a saint (died 1946).
19 October – Subrahmanyan Chandrasekhar, astrophysicist and joint Nobel Prize in Physics winner (died 1995).
4 December – R. Venkataraman, politician and 8th President of India(died 2009).
11 December – Hari Singh Inspector General of Forests (died 2003)

Full date unknown
Motilal, actor (died 1965).

Deaths

References

 
India
Years of the 20th century in India